Bud S. Smith is an American film editor, producer, and director. He shared the 1984 BAFTA Award for Best Editing for Flashdance and also shared the 2008 American Cinema Editors Career Achievement Award. He is a regular collaborator of director William Friedkin, serving as editor on six of his films. He was nominated for Academy Awards for Flashdance (1983) and The Exorcist (1973). He is married to dialogue editor Lucy Coldsnow-Smith.

Filmography

Awards and nominations

Academy Awards 

 1974 Academy Award for Best Film Editing: The Exorcist - with Evan A. Lottman & Norman Gay (nominated)
 1984 Academy Award for Best Film Editing: Flashdance - with Walt Mulconery (nominated)

American Cinema Editors Awards 

 1984: American Cinema Editors Award for Best Edited Feature Film – Dramatic: Flashdance - with Walt Mulconery (nominated)
 2008: American Cinema Editors Career Achievement Award (won)

British Academy of Film and Television Awards 

 1984 BAFTA Award for Best Editing: Flashdance - with Walt Mulconery (won)

References

External links

American Cinema Editors
Living people
Artists from Tulsa, Oklahoma
Best Editing BAFTA Award winners
Year of birth missing (living people)
American film editors